Gopinathpur is a village in Baleshwar Sadar subdistrict in Baleshwar District in the Indian state of Odisha.  it had a population of 986 in 240 households. The nearest major railway station is the BALASORE railway station.

Geography
The village is 3 km from Nilgiri.

Economy
Most of the people depend on cultivation.

References

Villages in Balasore district